Brian "Elwood" Reid (born December 19, 1966) is an American novelist, short-story writer and television screenwriter.

Early life
Reid was born in Cleveland, Ohio in a working-class area. Reid played college football for the Michigan Wolverines from 1985 to 1986 on a football scholarship.

A great influence on him was American novelist Elmore Leonard. When he died in  August, 2013, Reid, who considered Leonard to be a major influence, extended condolences to Leonard on Twitter and praised him as being "one of the greats".

Prose

Novels
D.B. (Doubleday, 2004; Anchor Books, paperback, 2005)
Midnight Sun (Doubleday, 2000; Anchor Books, paperback, 2002)
If I Don't Six (Doubleday, 1998)

Short story collections
What Salmon Know (Doubleday, 1999)

Television
Close to Home (2006-2007)
Cold Case (2008-2010)
Undercovers (2010-2011)
Hawaii 5-0 (2011-2012)
The Bridge (2013-2014)
The Chi (2018–present)
 Barkskins (2020–present)
 Big Sky (2021)

References

Further reading

 Publishers Weekly
 The New York Times
 The New York Times
 The New York Times
 Publishers Weekly
 The New York Times Book Reviews

External links
 

University of Michigan alumni
20th-century American novelists
21st-century American novelists
Living people
American male novelists
American male short story writers
20th-century American short story writers
21st-century American short story writers
20th-century American male writers
1966 births
21st-century American male writers